Kim Su-an (born January 27, 2006) is a South Korean actress. She debuted in the entertainment industry when she was five years old, and has since featured in films and television series, eventually gaining wider recognition with her role in the international hit film Train to Busan (2016).

Career

2011–2015: Beginnings
Kim debuted as an actress in the film Sorry, Thanks in 2011. Since then, she has become an in-demand child actress in both independent and big-budget films like Sprout (2013) Mad Sad Bad (2014) and Coin Locker Girl (2015).

2016–present: Rising popularity
In 2016, she gained wider recognition for playing the daughter of Gong Yoo's character in the box-office zombie hit Train to Busan. The same year, she signed an exclusive contract with talent management agency Blossom Entertainment.

In 2017, she starred in the action film The Battleship Island, playing Hwang Jung-min's daughter. She was awarded the Best Supporting Actress award at the Buil Film Awards. She also appeared in Along With The Gods: The Two Worlds  (2017).

Filmography

Film

Television series

Web series

Awards and nominations

References

External links

 Kim Su-an at Blossom Entertainment
 
 
 
 

2006 births
Living people
South Korean child actresses
South Korean television actresses
South Korean film actresses
21st-century South Korean actresses